In enzymology, a pyruvate oxidase is an enzyme that catalyzes the chemical reaction

pyruvate + phosphate + O2  acetyl phosphate + CO2 + H2O2

The 3 substrates of this enzyme are pyruvate, phosphate, and O2, whereas its 3 products are acetyl phosphate, CO2, and H2O2.

This enzyme belongs to the family of oxidoreductases, specifically those acting on the aldehyde or oxo group of donor with oxygen as acceptor.  The systematic name of this enzyme class is pyruvate:oxygen 2-oxidoreductase (phosphorylating). Other names in common use include pyruvic oxidase, and phosphate-dependent pyruvate oxidase.  This enzyme participates in pyruvate metabolism.  It has 2 cofactors: FAD,  and Thiamin diphosphate.

Structural studies

References

 
 

EC 1.2.3
Flavoproteins
Thiamin diphosphate enzymes
Enzymes of known structure